Adyenda is a Philippine television public affairs show broadcast by GMA Network, GMA News TV, and Light TV. Hosted by Joel Villanueva and later Alex Tinsay, it premiered in 2005. The show concluded on January 5, 2018. It was replaced by Lifegiver in its timeslot.

Hosts
 Alex Tinsay 
 Joel Villanueva

References

2005 Philippine television series debuts
2018 Philippine television series endings
Filipino-language television shows
GMA Network original programming
GMA News TV original programming
Light TV original programming
Philippine television shows
Q (TV network) original programming